Heliosperma pusillum is a species of flowering plants in the family Caryophyllaceae. It is native to mountain ranges of Western Europe. It's a species of plants with a complex evolutionary history characterized by repeated ecological divergence.

References

pusillum